The Salta Argentina Temple is a temple of the Church of Jesus Christ of Latter-day Saints under construction in Salta, Argentina.

History 
The intent to construct the temple was announced by church president Russell M. Nelson on April 1, 2018.  The Salta Argentina Temple was announced concurrently with 6 other temples. At the time, the number of operating or announced temples was 189. 

On November 4, 2020, a groundbreaking to signify beginning of construction was held, with Benjamín De Hoyos, president of the South America South Area, presiding. The groundbreaking was originally scheduled for August 15, 2020, but was postponed and then had limited in-person attendance, due to the COVID-19 pandemic.

See also 

 List of temples of The Church of Jesus Christ of Latter-day Saints
 List of temples of The Church of Jesus Christ of Latter-day Saints by geographic region
 The Church of Jesus Christ of Latter-day Saints in Argentina
 Comparison of temples of The Church of Jesus Christ of Latter-day Saints
 Temple architecture (Latter-day Saints)

References

External links 

 Church Newsroom of The Church of Jesus Christ of Latter-day Saints

 Salta Argentina Temple at ChurchofJesusChristTemples.org

Temples (LDS Church) in Argentina
Proposed religious buildings and structures of the Church of Jesus Christ of Latter-day Saints
The Church of Jesus Christ of Latter-day Saints in Argentina
21st-century Latter Day Saint temples
Proposed buildings and structures in Argentina